The Knitting is a 2012 South Korean short film and is the directorial debut of singer and actress Yoon Eun-hye. The film is Yoon's first assignment after entering the Graduate School of Advanced Imaging Science, Multimedia & Film at Chung-Ang University. It made its world premiere at the 17th Busan International Film Festival where it was screened in the Wide Angle category as part of the Korean Short Film Competition.

Plot 
A woman is moving things. A pile of books, diaries and photographs, a cluttered house. He finds a knitting in a box and falls into knitting, but soon finds himself searching through the veranda with his friend's love affair.

Cast 

Lee Sang-hee as woman

References

2012 films
2012 short documentary films
South Korean short documentary films
2010s Korean-language films
2010s South Korean films